The Munghorn Gap Nature Reserve is a protected nature reserve that is located in the Central Tablelands region of New South Wales, in eastern Australia. The Castle Rocks walking trail reveals pagoda-like sandstone formations.

The average elevation of the terrain is 569 meters.

Flora and fauna

Many plants and animals are at their eastern or westernmost points of natural distribution. The reserve is situated at one of the lowest points of the Great Divide. The streams forming from the east reach the Hunter River, and those from the west eventually flow to the Darling River.

The flora of the area is an interesting combination of the moist mountain plants and those of the drier western plains. Vegetation is mostly dominated by Eucalyptus and Callitris pine.

The reserve is particularly noted for the high bird diversity.  It lies within the Mudgee-Wollar Important Bird Area, so identified by BirdLife International because of its importance for the endangered regent honeyeater.

Typical mountain or eastern forest birds such as the superb lyrebird and satin bowerbird are present, as are emus and cockatiels, more usually seen west of the dividing range. Some 164 species of birds have been recorded. Facilities are present for birdwatchers.

History 
The western Wiradjuri people traveled through the area, trading with other indigenous Australians east of the divide. Europeans in the 19th century were present. They traveled across the range, on horse and bullock teams. There is also evidence of peat and coal mining, collection of wood, quarrying, prospecting and blacksmithing.

This place stands out with the historical heritage of the Aboriginal people of Wiradjuri.

See also

 Goulburn River National Park
 Protected areas of New South Wales

References

Nature reserves in New South Wales
Central Tablelands
Hunter Region
Important Bird Areas of New South Wales
1961 establishments in Australia
Protected areas established in 1961